Silca S.p.A. is a manufacturer of keys, key cutting machines, semi industrial and industrial key cutting machines.
Silca S.p.A. is a subsidiary of Kaba Group, a provider of selected segments of the security industry. Kaba Holding AG is listed on the SIX Swiss Stock Exchange and employs around 7,500 people in more than 60 countries. The Silca brand is internationally recognized within the key business due to its widespread distribution. Silca distributes its products all over the world through 130 selected distributors and 8 Business units (Italy, Germany, France, the United Kingdom, Spain, the Netherlands, India and Brazil).

History 
Silca was founded as “Società per Azioni” Società Italiana Lavorazione Chiavi e Affini in 1974 in Vittorio Veneto, Italy, transforming the handcraft of key manufacturing and duplication into an industrial activity.

In the span of ten years I.M.P.S.A., now Silca S.A.S., was founded in Paris, Silca U.K. Ltd. in London, and Silca Deutschland GmbH in Heiligenhaus, later moved to Velbert, Germany. In 1989 Silca started operating overseas with the subsidiary Silca Keys U.S.A. based in Twinsburg (Ohio).

In the late 1990s, Silca acquired several companies specialised in the production of key machinery and security products (Bollini s.r.l., GBZ, Elzett) and in 1997 it merged with the Canadian key manufacturer Unican Group. In 2000 the Spanish Business Unit Silca Unican Iberica S.A., today Silca Key Systems S.A., was opened in Barcelona. In the same year Silca acquired its competitor Ilco Orion S.p.A.

In 2001 Kaba Holding AG took over the Unican Group, creating one of the largest companies worldwide operating within the security business.
In the first decade of 2000 Silca has increased the functions and technologies applied to its key cutting machines and the launch of customised finishing for key blanks.

Silca is certified ISO 9001:2008 and  ISO/TS 16949:2009 (Automotive Keys) for the high quality standards of its production processes.

Core business and products 
Silca's core business is represented by the production of key blanks, with a product range of over 66,000 items designed for the most diverse uses, from airplanes to mail-boxes keys.

Silca designs and manufactures key cutting machines, both mechanical and electronic, and related accessories, customised duplicating and originating semi industrial and industrial systems for the lock and automotive industries, in over 250 versions, and engineers in-house software solutions dedicated to the electronic programming and duplication of keys.

Sponsoring 
From its origins, Silca has supported human and sports values for youth's growth. This is the reason why the company has promoted and supported various sports initiatives. In particular, Silca supports the following disciplines through two company's Sportsteams:
 Atletica Silca Conegliano - 33 years of support and training in all athletic disciplines for hundreds of young athletes aged 6–16.
 Silca Ultralite Vittorio Veneto -  22 years of sports training and events organisation in the discipline of Triathlon. Silca Ultralite was born as company sports club and its name stems from the coloured keys brand Silca Ultralite.
Silca has contributed to the development of the local community by entering the consortium of companies and public authorities that made possible the building of the kindergarten Asilo Nido Interaziendale l'Aquilone in San Giacomo di Veglia (Treviso).

See also 

List of Italian companies

Press 
  Rai 3, TG Regione, Silca, Your, by Massimo Zennaro, 19 November 2012
  Il sole 24 Ore, Made in NordEst, Il futuro tecnologico della chiave. Silca e il mondo della sicurezza, 15 December 2012

External links
 Silca website
 Kaba Group website
 Atletica Silca Conegliano website
 Silca Ultralite Vittorio Veneto website

Industrial machine manufacturers
Engineering companies of Italy
Multinational companies headquartered in Italy
Manufacturing companies established in 1974
Italian companies established in 1974
Italian brands